Sevcec was a Spanish-language talk show, hosted by journalist Pedro Sevcec and broadcast by Telemundo from 1994 until 1999. It aired weekdays at 4:00 p.m. from 1994 through 1998 and at 2:00 p.m from 1998-1999 Eastern Time.

Broadcast history
The show was created in 1994 by Telemundo's then-president Joaquin Blaya, who also helped create the Cristina show during his years as president of rival network Univision. Pedro Sevcec, who at the time was a co-anchor and reporter for Ocurrió Así, was selected to host and the show was titled Sevcec after his last name. It was the first Spanish-language talk show in the U.S. to have a male host, with Sevcec being dubbed the "Latin Phil Donahue".

The show became a success, taping over 1,200 episodes and winning seven Emmy Awards. However, with the show being up against the long-running Cristina in the 4:00 p.m. timeslot, Sevcecs ratings began to decline and it was cancelled in 1999. Laura en America took over the timeslot upon its arrival to the network that year.

References

Telemundo original programming
1994 American television series debuts
1999 American television series endings
1990s American television talk shows
Spanish-language television programming in the United States